Sport Fishing 2 is a fishing simulation video game developed by Ryobi and published by Sega for the arcades in 1995. It is the sequel to Sports Fishing (1994).

Gameplay
Sport Fishing 2 is a game in which the player controls a deep-sea fishing rod, which simulates the feeling of fish pulling on the line.

Development and release
The game is the sequel to the original Sports Fishing. The first fishing simulation game was not distributed in a cartridge and CD-ROM, but only distributed in a ROM Board, composed of the ST-V motherboard and Laserdisc, released in 1994. The original Sports Fishing was Japan's sixth highest-grossing dedicated arcade cabinet of 1995.

The sequel to the fishing simulation game, Sport Fishing 2, was distributed directly in a cartridge and CD-ROM with the ST-V motherboard as a standard and is somewhat similar to the Saturn console. The game Sport Fishing 2 was more successful than the previous one.

Reception
In Japan, Game Machine listed Sports Fishing 2 on their September 15, 1995 issue as being the third most-successful dedicated arcade game of the month. Next Generation reviewed the arcade version of the game, rating it three stars out of five, and stated that "like the unlucky soul we saw playing the game, when one out of two catches is a chunk of driftwood, you may bring that primal urge to a cool fighting or driving game instead of going fishing in FMV."

Reviews
Ultima Generacion 09
Player One Magazine

References

1995 video games
Arcade video games
Arcade-only video games
Fishing video games
Sega arcade games
Video games developed in Japan